Carlsberg Lighthouse (Danish: Carlsberg Fyrtårn), also known as the Lime Tower (Danish: Kridttårnet) after the limestone which is its dominating building material, is a former lighthouse located in the Carlsberg area of Copenhagen, Denmark.

History
 
 
Built in 1883, the Lime Tower was originally part of a new main entrance for J.C. Jacobsen's Carlsberg Brewery site in Valby. The brewery had assumed the name Gammel Carlsberg (en: Old Carlsberg) after his son, Carl Jacobsen, due to a controversy between them, had established a new brewery which, with his father's consent, traded under the name Ny Carlsberg (en: New Carlsberg). The new main entrance was an arch, which incorporated the new name in gilded letters. The gate was connected to the Lime Tower by a wall which was also built in limestone. 

Electric lighting had been introduced in the brewery in 1882, at a time when it was still not widely available in Copenhagen. Since the site was also located on high ground, atop Valby Hill, it was decided to combine the guardhouse with a lighthouse.

Architecture

The lighthouse is built to a Historicist design, drawing on Medieval castle towers for inspiration. It is built in limestone from Stevns and stands on a granite plinth.

The gate consists of two granite pillars which are connected by a cast iron arch featuring Gammel Carlsberg's name in gilded letters. The arch is topped by a 12-pointed star, a symbol which J. C. Jacobsen used as a trademark and had recently registered as such in the newly established trademark register. A series of dates, representing key events in the history of the brewery are inscribed on the pillars: 1847 for the first brew, 1867 for the year the brewery burned, 1870 for the building of the so-called Annex Brewery, and 1883 for the building of the Gate.

Carlsberg Lighthouse today
The light and guardhouse was rented out in 2009 and was used as a combined residence and studio by an artist.
On 10th December 2021 the Swiss art gallery von Bartha opened a new gallery space located in the Carlsberg Lighthouse, continuing the gallery’s tradition of using distinctive architectural space.

See also
 List of lighthouses in Denmark

References

External links
 Heliograph

Lighthouses completed in 1883
Lighthouses in Denmark
Listed transport buildings and structures in Copenhagen
Limestone buildings in Denmark